Amy Meredith were an Australian pop band who released a self-titled EP in 2008. In 2009, having already been dropped from their label Tsubi/Ksubi, Amy Meredith signed a deal with Sony Music Australia, and released their debut single Pornstar. Much later, in March 2010, Amy Meredith released their second single, Lying, which peaked at No. 10, making it their only top 10 single. Their debut album, Restless was released on 2 July 2010 and reached No. 8 on the ARIA Albums Chart. The album was met with extremely negative reviews and shortly afterwards Sony terminated their deal with the band, so Amy Meredith turned to Vector Management for a distribution deal.

In 2013, with no label, Amy Meredith tried to release their second album, Maps following a crowd funding effort to raise the required money, however the album was not a success and failed to produce any charted singles. Since its release the band have been inactive, and their Facebook page has displayed "new album out September" since 2013.

Discography

Studio albums

Extended plays

Singles

Music videos

Award nominations

References 

Australian pop music groups
Musical groups established in 2006
Musical groups from Sydney